Germán Dehesa (July 1, 1944 – September 2, 2010) was a Mexican journalist, academic and writer.

Dehesa was born in Mexico City on July 1, 1944. He studied both Hispanic literature and chemical engineering at the National Autonomous University of Mexico.

Dehesa wrote six plays and eleven books during his career. His works included Fallaste, Corazon! (You Failed, Heart!), Los PRIsidentes and Las Nuevas Aventuras de El Principito (The New Adventures of The Little Prince). He taught as a professor at the National Autonomous University of Mexico for 25 years. In May 2008, Dehesa was awarded the Don Quixote Prize by the government of Castile-La Mancha in Spain for his article Ah, Que Tiempos! (Ah, What Times!).

Dehesa died at his home in Mexico City on September 2, 2010, at the age of 66. He had published his last newspaper column, Gaceta del Angel (Angel's Gazette), in the Reforma newspaper days before his death.

Written works
Cuaderno de apuntes 
La música de los años
Adiós a las trampas
La familia 
¡Qué modos!: usos y costumbres tenochcas
¿Cómo nos arreglamos? Prontuario de la corrupción de México
Las nuevas aventuras de El Principito
No basta ser padre
Viajero que vas
Cuestión de amores
Adiós a las trampas 2
Los PRIsidentes
Fallaste corazón
Cuestión de amor

Theatrical works
Tapadeus
El gabinete de Belem
Borges con música
Fallaste corazón
Neruda, no cabe duda
Zedilleus
Las Arcas Perdidas
El pórtico de las palomas
Pacto con botas
Monjas coronadas
Cartas a Santa Fox
Cuando tenga 64 años
Cancionero Mexicano Verde, Blanco y Rojo

References

1944 births
2010 deaths
Mexican journalists
Male journalists
Mexican columnists
Mexican dramatists and playwrights
Academic staff of the National Autonomous University of Mexico
National Autonomous University of Mexico alumni
People from Mexico City
20th-century Mexican dramatists and playwrights
Male dramatists and playwrights
20th-century Mexican male writers